Carl Anton Swanson (May 1, 1879 – October 9, 1949) was the founder of the national food production company Swanson.

Background
Carl Anton Swanson was born in Karlskrona, Blekinge County, Sweden. He came to the United States in 1896 at the age of 17, arriving with a tag around his neck where it was written "Carl Swanson, Swedish. Send me to Omaha. I speak no English." He then settled in Omaha, Nebraska's community of immigrant Swedish-Americans.

Career
In 1899, Carl Swanson became a partner with John O. Jerpe in a small wholesale company.  Jerpe Commission Company purchased eggs and cream from local farmers which they processed and sold.  In 1905, Swanson bought the company from Jerpe under a partnership with John Hjerpe and Frank Ellison. They operated a commission business hauling eggs, milk and poultry they bought from local farmers and selling them to the grocery stores and hotels in Omaha, Nebraska. The enterprise was eventually incorporated.  Frank Ellison died in 1918 and John Hjerpe in 1928.  After John Hjerpe's death, Swanson became the sole owner of the corporation.  

By 1938, the Swanson enterprise was one of the larger creameries in the United States and during World War II became a major supplier of poultry and egg products to the U.S. military.  In 1945, the company's name was officially changed to C.A. Swanson and Sons. After Carl Swanson died in 1949, his two sons, Gilbert Carl (1906–1968) and W. Clarke Swanson, took over the company.

Personal life
Carl Swanson was married to Caroline Swanson.  He was the father of Gilbert Carl Swanson, Walter Clarke Swanson, and Gretchen Velde.

References

External links

Related Reading
Allen, Gary J. ; Ken Albala  (2007)   The Business of Food: Encyclopedia of the Food and Drink Industries (ABC-CLIO)  
Smith, Andrew F.  (2011)  Eating History: 30 Turning Points in the Making of American Cuisine  (Columbia University Press) 

1879 births
1949 deaths
Businesspeople from Omaha, Nebraska
American food company founders
People from Karlskrona
People from Blekinge
Swedish emigrants to the United States
Swedish-American culture in Nebraska